Volot is the name of several rural localities in Volotovsky District of Novgorod Oblast, Russia:
Volot, Gorskoye Settlement, Volotovsky District, Novgorod Oblast, a village in Gorskoye Settlement
Volot, Volot Settlement, Volotovsky District, Novgorod Oblast, a settlement of rural type in Volot Settlement